The Benicia–Martinez Bridge refers to three parallel bridges which cross the Carquinez Strait just west of Suisun Bay in California; the spans link Benicia on the north side with Martinez on the south.

The original  deck truss bridge opened in 1962 to replace the last automotive ferry service in the San Francisco Bay Area. It was named the George Miller Jr., Memorial Bridge in 1975 after California state legislator George Miller Jr. A  bridge was built alongside and opened on August 25, 2007 with five lanes of northbound traffic. In 2007, it was named the Congressman George Miller Benicia–Martinez Bridge after U.S. Congressman George Miller, Miller Jr.'s son. The cost of the 1962 span was US$25 million and US$1.3 billion for the 2007 span. (Adjusted for inflation, equivalent to $ and $ respectively.) The bridge is part of Interstate 680, a major transportation link connecting other heavily traveled freeways.

Between the two vehicle bridges is a Union Pacific Railroad bridge, the first bridge at this location, built between April 1929 and October 1930 by Southern Pacific. It is used by Union Pacific and BNSF (trackage rights) freight trains and 36 scheduled Amtrak passenger trains each weekday. Passenger trains include the long-distance trains California Zephyr and Coast Starlight and commuter-oriented Capitol Corridor  services.

Tolling
Tolls are only collected from northbound traffic at the toll plaza on the south side of the bridge. All-electronic tolling has been in effect since 2020, and drivers may either pay using the FasTrak electronic toll collection device, using the license plate tolling program, or via a one time payment online. Effective , the toll rate for passenger cars is $7. During peak traffic hours, carpool vehicles carrying three or more people, clean air vehicles, or motorcycles may pay a discounted toll of $3.50 if they have FasTrak and use the designated carpool lane. Drivers must pay within 48 hours after crossing the bridge or they will be sent a toll violation invoice. No additional fees will be added to the toll violation if it is paid within 21 days.

The toll plaza has nine lanes with toll booths and another nine lanes with open road tolling (ORT) in two zones.  One ORT zone has two travel lanes and four shoulder lanes.  The other ORT zone has one carpool travel lane with two shoulder lanes.  This bridge is the first open road tolling facility in Northern California and the first bridge with open road tolling in California.

Historical toll rates
When the Benicia–Martinez Bridge opened in 1962, tolls were $0.25 per car. It was set to $0.35 in 1970, then increased to $0.40 in 1976.

The basic toll (for automobiles) on the seven state-owned bridges, including the Benicia–Martinez Bridge, was raised to $1 by Regional Measure 1, approved by Bay Area voters in 1988. A $1 seismic retrofit surcharge was added in 1998 by the state legislature, originally for eight years, but since then extended to December 2037 (AB1171, October 2001). On March 2, 2004, voters approved Regional Measure 2, raising the toll by another dollar to a total of $3. An additional dollar was added to the toll starting January 1, 2007, to cover cost overruns concerning the replacement of the eastern span.

The Metropolitan Transportation Commission, a regional transportation agency, in its capacity as the Bay Area Toll Authority, administers RM1 and RM2 funds, a significant portion of which are allocated to public transit capital improvements and operating subsidies in the transportation corridors served by the bridges. Caltrans administers the "second dollar" seismic surcharge, and receives some of the MTC-administered funds to perform other maintenance work on the bridges. The Bay Area Toll Authority is made up of appointed officials put in place by various city and county governments, and is not subject to direct voter oversight.

Due to further funding shortages for seismic retrofit projects, the Bay Area Toll Authority again raised tolls on all seven of the state-owned bridges in July 2010. The toll rate for autos on the Benicia–Martinez Bridge was thus increased to $5.

In June 2018, Bay Area voters approved Regional Measure 3 to further raise the tolls on all seven of the state-owned bridges to fund $4.5 billion worth of transportation improvements in the area. Under the passed measure, the toll rate for autos on the Benicia–Martinez Bridge will be increased to $6 on January 1, 2019; to $7 on January 1, 2022; and then to $8 on January 1, 2025.

In September 2019, the MTC approved a $4 million plan to eliminate toll takers and convert all seven of the state-owned bridges to all-electronic tolling, citing that 80 percent of drivers are now using Fastrak and the change would improve traffic flow. On March 20, 2020, accelerated by the COVID-19 pandemic, all-electronic tolling was placed in effect for all seven state-owned toll bridges. The MTC then installed new systems at all seven bridges to make them permanently cashless by the start of 2021. In April 2022, the Bay Area Toll Authority announced plans to remove all remaining unused toll booths and create an open-road tolling system which functions at highway speeds.

Railroad bridge

Union Pacific Railroad's Benicia-Martinez drawbridge is between the two vehicle bridges. The railroad bridge was built between 1928 and 1930 for Southern Pacific Railroad to replace its train ferry between Benicia and Port Costa, California. It is the second-longest railway bridge in North America, and the longest railway bridge west of the Mississippi River. Before the bridge was completed, ferries were used to allow the railway to cross Suisun Bay. The original ferry, built at Oakland, California in 1879 and named the Solano, was the world's largest train ferry. In 1914 the larger Contra Costa was built. In 1926 the ferries carried 93,000 passenger cars and 142,000 freight cars across the Strait.

Train ferry service ended with the opening of the railroad bridge on October 15, 1930.

Burlington Northern and Santa Fe Railway and Amtrak also run here on trackage rights. The drawbridge has the smallest clearances of the three bridges — lift span horizontal clearance is 291 feet and vertical clearances are 70 feet (closed) and 135 feet (open).

Northbound span
In late 2001, construction began on a newer bridge east of and parallel to the railroad bridge. It measures about 1.7 miles (2.7 km). The new bridge carries five lanes of northbound traffic. The older bridge underwent seismic retrofits and was converted from carrying three lanes in each direction to carrying four lanes of southbound traffic and a bicycle/pedestrian lane, part of the San Francisco Bay Trail. The bridge construction included a new toll plaza with nine toll booths, two open road tolling lanes and one carpool lane at the south end of the bridge, although tolls continue to be charged only for northbound traffic. The old toll plaza at the north end of the bridge was removed.

The new toll plaza was retrofitted for open road tolling to encourage FasTrak use. This required the removal of eight toll booths.

The bridge is the largest lightweight concrete segmental bridge in California. The estimated cost was $1.05 billion, the final cost was $1.3 billion. The original estimated cost was around $300 million, it is noted for its large delay in construction and large over cost (over $1 billion). The project's cost overshadowed the replacement of the Cypress Freeway portion of Interstate 880.  The new bridge opened at 10:30pm on August 25, 2007.

Vista point
A vista point is located on the north side of the span, providing an excellent view of the 3 parallel bridges passing over the  Carquinez Strait with Mount Diablo in the background. It has ample parking, picnic tables and a large compass to provide orientation. This is typically the point where cyclists and pedestrians wishing to cross the bridge park their cars.

See also
 California Pacific Railroad
 Carquinez Bridge

References

External links
 Bay Area FasTrak – includes toll information on this and the other Bay Area toll facilities
 California Dept. of Transportation: Benicia–Martinez Bridge History & Information
 Caltrans' New Benicia–Martinez Bridge project page
 Earth Mechanics Inc. Benicia bridge project page - geotechnical engineer for the new bridge
 Benicia–Martinez Bridge may cost millions more - Contra Costa Times article about technical difficulties
 
 

Bridges in the San Francisco Bay Area
Carquinez Strait
Bridges in Contra Costa County, California
Bridges in Solano County, California
Road bridges in California
Bridges on the Interstate Highway System
Interstate 80
Railroad bridges in California
Benicia, California
Martinez, California
San Francisco Bay
Steel bridges in the United States
Toll bridges in California
Tolled sections of Interstate Highways
Truss bridges in the United States
Bridges completed in 1930
Bridges completed in 1962
Bridges completed in 2007
San Francisco Bay Trail
Union Pacific Railroad bridges